Samuel Timberg (May 21, 1903 – August 26, 1992) was an American musician and composer for the stage, film studios, and television.

Biography
Timberg was born in New York City to a Jewish family originating in Austria, youngest son of Israel and Mary Timberg and brother of vaudeville performers Herman Timberg and Hattie Darling.  He studied piano under Rubin Goldmark with hopes of becoming a classical performer; the death of his father in 1919, however, forced him to leave his studies and find work.  Just 16, Sammy joined Herman's act as a straight man, and also began conducting the orchestra.

To increase the family earnings, Herman also wrote material for other acts, including Georgie Price and Clark and McCullough (and, a few years later, Phil Silvers). In 1920 the Timbergs were hired by Chico Marx to develop a follow-up to the Marx Brothers hit revue Home Again after the failure of the 1918 Kahn/Swerling production Cinderella Girl. In February 1921 the Marx Brothers introduced On The Mezzanine which toured across the US and in Britain; it was written by Herman and managed by Hattie, while 18-year old Sammy led the orchestra and co-wrote the music.

Sammy also found work with other performers and in 1929 supplied songs for Broadway revues Broadway Nights, Dutchess of Chicago, and The Street Singer, all choreographed by Busby Berkeley.  He also worked for the Shuberts, and organized and led his own touring orchestra.

Timberg was perhaps most famous for the music he wrote for cartoons while music director of the Fleischer Studios, such as Popeye, Betty Boop, and Superman.  He also contributed songs to two Fleischer feature-length animated films, Gulliver's Travels and Mr. Bug Goes to Town. Possibly his best known and most-recorded song, It's a Hap-Hap-Happy Day, was a feature from Gulliver.  He remained with the organization to compose shorts when the Fleischers were succeeded by Famous Studios, serving as the studio's musical director until Winston Sharples officially succeeded him in 1943.

He composed and conducted the score for MGM recording of the Lionel Barrymore A Christmas Carol.  He unsuccessfully managed the early career of Jackie Gleason, and wrote music for Gleason, Frank Sinatra, Eydie Gormé, and others until he retired in the 1960s.

In the 1960s Timberg moved to Scranton, Pennsylvania, where he died in 1992.  He was the father of writer and journalist Robert Timberg, Patricia Timberg and Rosemarie Eisenberg Shaw.

Well-known Songs
 Don't Take My Boop-Oop-A-Doop Away (1931)
 Brotherly Love (1936), from the Popeye cartoon of that name.
 It's a Hap-Hap-Happy Day (1939), with Sharples and Nieburg
 Boy, Oh Boy (1941) with Frank Loesser
 Help Yourself To My Heart (1947), Frank Sinatra

In 2004, Timberg's daughter Pat released a CD of his music: Boop-Oop-A-Doin': modern recordings of Sammy Timberg, composer for the Max Fleischer toons.

See also
 Bob Rothberg
 Ants in the Plants

References

External links
 Timberg Alley, the website for the Timberg family.
 
 AllMusic Biography

1903 births
1992 deaths
Jewish American composers
American people of Austrian-Jewish descent
20th-century American composers
Animation composers
Paramount Global people
Fleischer Studios people
Famous Studios people
Musicians from New York City
20th-century American Jews